Joye Estazie (born August 10, 1984) is a Mauritian footballer who currently plays as a defender for AS de Vacoas-Phoenix in the Mauritian League.

Career

Senior career
Estazie started off his professional career in 2006 with PAS Mates of the Mauritian League, where he later served as captain of the team. In 2011, he transferred to AS de Vacoas-Phoenix.

International career
Estazie has earned eight caps for Mauritius. On October 9, 2010, he scored an own goal for Senegal in the 90th minute of Mauritius' AFCON qualifying match, which Mauritius lost 7-0. He scored his first goal for Mauritius in a friendly draw against Réunion in September 2012.

References

External links

1984 births
Living people
Mauritian footballers
Mauritius international footballers
Association football defenders